Gary Nelson may refer to:

Gary Nelson (director) (1934–2022), American film director
Gary Nelson (auto racing) (born 1953), NASCAR champion crew chief and inspector, IMSA champion team manager
Gary Lee Nelson (born 1940), American composer and media artist
Gary V. Nelson (born 1953), Canadian pastor
Gary Nelson (bishop), bishop of the Anglican Diocese of North West Australia
Gary A. Nelson (born c. 1936), American former politician in the state of Washington
Gary K. Nelson (1935–2013), American politician in Arizona

See also
Garry Nelson (born 1961), English footballer